Yrjö Helander (23 April 1896 – 28 August 1969) was a Finnish athlete. He competed in the men's pole vault at the 1924 Summer Olympics.

References

External links
 

1896 births
1969 deaths
Athletes (track and field) at the 1924 Summer Olympics
Finnish male pole vaulters
Olympic athletes of Finland